Knox Township may refer to:

Knox Township, Knox County, Illinois
Knox Township, Jay County, Indiana
Knox Township, Clarke County, Iowa
Knox Township, Pottawattamie County, Iowa
Knox Township, Benson County, North Dakota
Knox Township, Columbiana County, Ohio
Knox Township, Guernsey County, Ohio
Knox Township, Holmes County, Ohio
Knox Township, Jefferson County, Ohio
Knox Township, Vinton County, Ohio
Knox Township, Clarion County, Pennsylvania
Knox Township, Clearfield County, Pennsylvania
Knox Township, Jefferson County, Pennsylvania

Township name disambiguation pages